Move is the fourth studio album by garage rock band The Original Sins, released in 1992 through Psonik Records. The album was intended to be a break into mainstream music for the band, but the record sold poorly among its initial release. The album's production duties were credited to Peter Buck, guitarist with R.E.M., but most of the production was actually done by John Keane.

After the album's release, Dave Ferrarra left the group, who would not come back until the release of Suburban Primitive. He would be replaced with drummer Seth Baer.

Critical reception
The Los Angeles Times called the album a "sparkling 24-song marathon ... that ranges more widely through ‘60s sources," writing that "none of these borrowings sounds stale, because of the sheer vigor and immediacy the band is able to bring to familiar styles." Trouser Press wrote that "in a masterful display of greatness, the two-dozen three-minute tracks (all J.T. originals!) vary the emotional and stylistic temperature more than ever."

Track listing

Personnel

The Original Sins
John Terlesky - Vocals, guitar, cover art
Ken Bussiere - Bass
Dan McKinney - Organ
Dave Ferrara - Drums

Production
John Keane - Engineering, production
Peter Buck - Production
Pat Dillette - Engineering
Michael Sarsfeild - Mastering
Pete Ciccone - Layout

References

External links
 

1992 albums
The Original Sins albums